Caio Takeo Kumahara (born 29 September 1983), commonly known as Caio Japa, is a Brazilian futsal player of Japanese descent who plays for Maritime Augusta in the Italian Serie A.

He scored 109 goals in 346 matches for Sporting CP.

References

External links
Sporting CP profile
FPF club profile

1983 births
Living people
Brazilian people of Japanese descent
Brazilian men's futsal players
C.F. Os Belenenses futsal players
Sporting CP futsal players
Place of birth missing (living people)